This is a list of professional wrestling video games and game series based on the American professional wrestling promotion WWE.

Standalone video games
MicroLeague Wrestling was the first WWF theme video game to be released. The game was available for Commodore 64 and Atari ST and in 1989 for Amiga and DOS. 
WWF European Rampage Tour was released in 1992 for the Amiga, Atari ST, Commodore 64 and MS-DOS. 
WWF Rage in the Cage was released in 1993 for the Sega CD gaming system. 
WWF Attitude was released by Acclaim Entertainment in 1999 for the PlayStation, Game Boy Color, Sega Dreamcast & Nintendo 64. 
WWF No Mercy was released in 2000 for the Game Boy Color and Nintendo 64. 
With Authority! was released in 2001 solely for home computers.
WWF Betrayal was released in 2001 and available only for the Game Boy Color. 
WWE Crush Hour was released in 2003 and was available on PlayStation 2 and GameCube. 
WWE Aftershock was released in 2005 on N-Gage. 
WWE All Stars was released in 2011 for PlayStation 3, Xbox 360 PlayStation Portable, Wii, Nintendo 3DS and PlayStation 2.

Arcade-released games
WWF Superstars was released in 1989. This marked the first arcade WWF/E game. 
WWF WrestleFest was developed by Technōs Japan and released in 1991, distributed by Technōs in Japan and North America and by Tecmo in Europe and Australasia. 
WWF WrestleMania: The Arcade Game was released in 1995. 
WWF Royal Rumble was released in 2000.

WrestleMania series

WWF WrestleMania (1989) was the first WrestleMania-based video game to be released. It was released in 1989 for  Nintendo Entertainment System. 
WWF WrestleMania Challenge was released in 1990 and was available for the Nintendo Entertainment System. 
WWF WrestleMania (1991) was released in 1991 and was available for Amiga, Amstrad CPC, Atari ST, Commodore 64, ZX Spectrum, and DOS. 
WWF Super WrestleMania was released in 1992 and was available for the Super Nintendo Entertainment System and the Mega Drive/Genesis. 
WWF WrestleMania: Steel Cage Challenge was released in 1992 for Nintendo Entertainment System and in 1993 for the Sega Master System and the Sega Game Gear handheld console. 
WWF WrestleMania 2000 was released in 1999 for the Nintendo 64. 
WWF Road to WrestleMania was released in 2001 for Game Boy Advance. 
WWE WrestleMania X8 was released in 2002 for GameCube. 
WWE Road to WrestleMania X8 was released in 2002 for Game Boy Advance. 
WWE WrestleMania XIX was released in 2003 for GameCube. 
WWE WrestleMania 21 was released in 2005 for Xbox. 
WWE Legends of WrestleMania was released in 2009 for PlayStation 3, Xbox, and IOS.

Program-based games
WWF Superstars was released in 1991 for Game Boy. 
WWF Superstars 2 was released in 1992 for Game Boy. 
WWF Royal Rumble was released in 1993 for the Super NES and Sega Genesis. 
WWF King of the Ring was released in 1993 for the Nintendo Entertainment System and Game Boy. 
WWF Raw (1994) was released in 1994 for the SNES, 32X, Mega Drive/Genesis, and Game Boy. 
WWF In Your House was released in 1996 for the PlayStation, Sega Saturn, and DOS. 
WWF War Zone was released in 1998 for the PlayStation, Nintendo 64, and Game Boy. 
WWF No Mercy was released in 2000 for the Nintendo 64. 
WWF Raw (2002) was released in 2002 for Xbox and Microsoft Windows. 
WWE Raw 2 was released in 2003 for Xbox. 
WWE Survivor Series was released in 2004 for Game Boy Advance.

WWE 2K series

 WWE 2K (2015) was released in 2015 for Android and iOS.
WWE 2K Battlegrounds was released in 2021 for Android, iOS, Nintendo Switch, PlayStation 4, Xbox One, and Google Stadia. The game is intended as a replacement for the previously planned WWE 2K21.

See also

List of fighting games
List of licensed professional wrestling video games
List of wrestling video games

References

Professional wrestling games
WWE
WWE video games